The hypodiastole (Greek: ,), also known as a diastole, was an interpunct developed in late Ancient and Byzantine Greek texts before the separation of words by spaces was common. In the  then used, a group of letters might have separate meanings as a single word or as a pair of words. The papyrological hyphen showed a group of letters should be read together as a single word, and the hypodiastole showed that they should be taken separately. Compare "" ("whatever") to "" ("...that...").

The hypodiastole was similar in appearance to the comma and was eventually entirely conflated with it. A separate Unicode point, ISO/IEC 10646 standard (U+2E12) (⸒), exists for the hypodiastole but is intended only to reproduce its historical occurrence in Greek texts.

References

See also
 Interpunct
 Obelos
 Coronis
 Paragraphos

Palaeography
Punctuation
Ancient Greek punctuation